Ctirad Benáček (8 September 1924 – 1 December 1999) was a Czech basketball player. He competed in the men's tournament at the 1948 Summer Olympics. He died in Auckland, New Zealand on 1 December 1999, at the age of 75.

References

External links
 

1924 births
1999 deaths
Czech men's basketball players
Olympic basketball players of Czechoslovakia
Basketball players at the 1948 Summer Olympics
Sportspeople from Bratislava